The New York Knickerbockers were one of 8 teams in the short-lived United States Baseball League, which collapsed after just over a month of play. The Knickerbockers were owned by Charles White and managed by William Jordon.

1912 Standings 

New York finished dead last in the standings at the end at 2-15. They were the first USBL team to fold, doing so on May 28.

1912 New York Knickerbockers season

The 1912 New York Knickerbockers season was the first and only season for the club. They folded with the United States Baseball League after about a month of play.

Regular season 
Of the few individual game results known from that season, it is known that on opening day, May 1, 1912, the Knickerbockers battled with Reading to a 10-10 tie in 10 innings. The game was called due to darkness. New York eventually ended up last in the USBL standings.

Standings

Roster

Notable players
 Joe Wall

References 

 
United States Baseball League teams
Defunct sports teams in New York City
Defunct baseball teams in New York City
Defunct baseball teams in New York (state)
Baseball teams disestablished in 1912
Baseball teams established in 1912